Political Animals is a 2016 government simulation game developed by Philippine-based studio Squeaky Wheel and released by British independent publisher Positech Games, the latter which also made the Democracy video game series. The game focuses on implementing policies and dealing with scandals, in order to secure votes and win an election, which is the main goal.

References 

Government simulation video games
2016 video games
Linux games
MacOS games
Video games developed in the Philippines
Windows games
Positech Games games